These are tables of congressional delegations from Virginia to the United States Senate and United States House of Representatives. Virginia's current U.S. Senators are Democrats Mark Warner (serving since 2009) and Tim Kaine (serving since 2013). Virginia is allotted 11 seats in the U.S. House Of Representatives; currently, 6 seats are held by Democrats and 5 seats are held by Republicans.

The current dean of the Virginia delegation is Representative Bobby Scott (VA-3), having served in the House since 1993.

United States Senate

U.S. House of Representatives

Current members

1789 – 1793: 10 seats

1793 – 1803: 19 seats

1803 – 1813: 22 seats

1813 – 1823: 23 seats

1823 – 1833: 22 seats

1833 – 1843: 21 seats

1843 – 1853: 15 seats

1853 – 1863: 13 seats

1863 – 1873: 8 seats
The 1860 census allotted 11 seats to Virginia, but 3 were assigned to West Virginia, established in 1863. Virginia was left with 8 seats. For most of this decade, however, Virginian representatives were not seated in Congress because of Virginia's secession in the Civil War. After January 26, 1870, Virginia was allowed to seat members. The state convention called for a ninth seat, at-large, but the House rejected the credentials of its claimant, Joseph Segar.

1873 – 1883: 9 seats
Following the 1870 census, Virginia was allotted 9 seats.

1883 – 1933: 10 seats
After the 1880 census, Virginia gained one seat. For the 48th Congress, a new at-large seat was added to the 9 districts. Starting in the 49th Congress, however, the state was redistricted into 10 districts.

1933 – 1953: 9 seats
After the 1930 census, Virginia lost one seat. For the 73rd Congress (1933–1935), all nine representatives were elected at-large statewide. In all subsequent Congresses, representatives were elected from districts.

1953 – 1993: 10 seats
In 1953, Virginia gained one seat.

1993 – present: 11 seats
In 1993, Virginia gained one more seat, with no subsequent changes since 2003.

Key

See also

List of United States congressional districts
Virginia's congressional districts 
Political party strength in Virginia

Notes

References 

Government of Virginia
Virginia
Congressional delegations
Congressional delegations